Ellen Karcher (born February 28, 1964) is an American Democratic Party politician, who served in the New Jersey State Senate from 2004 until 2008, where she represented the 12th Legislative District.

Career
In the 2007 general election, Karcher lost her bid for another term against Republican Party candidate Jennifer Beck.

In the 2003 election, Senator Karcher defeated incumbent Republican Senate Co-President  John O. Bennett III, who was plagued by several ethics scandals including confirmed reports of double-billing local municipal governments. Before her election to the Senate, Karcher served on the Marlboro Township Council from 2002 to 2004, where she served as Council President. Karcher resigned from the Marlboro Township Council in January 2004 to take her seat in the Senate.

Karcher served on the Health, Human Services and Senior Citizens Committee (Vice Chair), the Wagering, Tourism and Historic Preservation Committee (Vice Chair), the Transportation Committee and the Joint Legislative Committee on Government Consolidation and Shared Services.

Karcher is the third generation of her family to have served in the New Jersey Legislature. She learned New Jersey politics from her father, the late Alan Karcher, who served in the Assembly from 1973 to 1990 and as Speaker of the Assembly from 1982 to 1985. Her grandfather, Joseph T. Karcher, served in the Assembly from 1930 to 1933.

Personal life
Karcher is a medical policy and research advisor, having performed data collection and analysis of treatment protocols for physicians in a multi-office practice. In addition, Ms. Karcher has been an adjunct professor at Rutgers University for a number of semesters, teaching various subjects, including courses in mass media and politics, mass political behavior, Congress and the Presidency.

Additionally, Karcher is affiliated with several professional organizations. She is a member of the American Political Science Association as well as a section member of State Politics and Policy. For several years, she has been an active Hospice volunteer and is an active fundraiser for the American Heart Association, the American Cancer Society and CAN. She is also an active member of the Mid Jersey Mothers of Multiples, an organization that meets monthly to discuss the challenges and pleasures of mothering multiple children.

Karcher graduated magna cum laude with a B.A. from Rutgers University with a double major in English and Political Science. She received an M.A. from the Eagleton Institute of Politics at Rutgers University in Political Science and Public Policy. Karcher is a Ph.D. Candidate at Rutgers University in Political Science. As an undergraduate, Karcher was elected to the Phi Beta Kappa honor society and was selected as a Henry Rutgers Scholar, a program designed to bring graduate level work to undergrads. During her masters studies, in addition to teaching undergraduate courses, she was named an Eagleton Fellow.

As of 2006, Karcher is married to Dr. John Hochberg. They have three children: Ben, Avie, and Lael. Karcher and her family are members of Congregation Kol Am, of Freehold.

As of 2010, Karcher is a substitute teacher at Collier High School in Marlboro.

References

External links
Senator Karcher's Campaign Website
Senator Karcher's Legislative Website, from Internet Archive as of January 25, 2008
Senator Ellen Karcher, Project Vote Smart
New Jersey Senate Democrats website biography of Senator Karcher
New Jersey Legislature financial disclosure form for 2006 (PDF)
New Jersey Legislature financial disclosure form for 2005 (PDF)
New Jersey Legislature financial disclosure form for 2004 (PDF)

1964 births
Living people
Jewish American state legislators in New Jersey
Democratic Party New Jersey state senators
People from Marlboro Township, New Jersey
Politicians from Monmouth County, New Jersey
Rutgers University alumni
Women state legislators in New Jersey
New Jersey city council members
Women city councillors in New Jersey
21st-century American Jews
21st-century American women politicians